Bobby Lee Gordon (December 7, 1935 – August 16, 1990) was an American football defensive back who played one season with the Houston Oilers of the American Football League (AFL). He was drafted by the Chicago Cardinals in the sixth round of the 1958 NFL Draft. He played college football at the University of Tennessee and attended Giles County High School in Pulaski, Tennessee.

References

External links
Just Sports Stats
College stats

1935 births
1990 deaths
Players of American football from Tennessee
American football defensive backs
Tennessee Volunteers football players
Chicago Cardinals players
Houston Oilers players
People from Pulaski, Tennessee
American Football League players